Naylor Road may refer to:

Transportation
 Maryland Route 637, also known as Naylor Road, a state highway in Hillcrest Heights, Maryland
 Naylor Road Line, a former MetroBus route
 Naylor Road station, a Metro station in Hillcrest Heights, Maryland

Other uses
 Doundou Chefou, Nigerian militant, codenamed "Naylor Road" by the United States